The ancient Egyptian Hand-with-droplets hieroglyph, Gardiner sign listed no. D46A is a portrayal of the hand, with droplet offerings. In the Old Kingdom usage it is found on ivory labels and slab stelas, presumably with the use of 'aroma' and unguents, or with incense. As the verb usage with 'libation', water or liquids are involved.

Usage
The hand-with-droplets hierogoglyph is used as a determinative for water libations, or the aroma droplets, (or incense) related to unguents. The Egyptian language usage of the noun, as "incense" or an "incense offering", is id, or id.t, represented as: M17-D46A:X1-.-M17-D46:X1-T12 The second spelling uses the bowstring hieroglyph as a determinative, presumably for its 'strength', and the 'power of unguent aromas'-(i.e. perfumes).

The Egyptian language verb form, "to cense, to pour out a libation",<ref>E.A.Wallace Budge, 1978, (1920), An Egyptian Hieroglyphic Dictionary, section "i", M17 pg. 101b.</ref> spelled as id, idy, has three hieroglyph spellings in the Budge two-volume dictionary. M17-D46A-M17-M17-.-M17-D46A-.-D46:N38-(hand-with-pool) The third uses the pool-lake-basin hieroglyph as determinative.

A third noun usage is for the word "dew", Egyptian language id. The single form has many spellings with the determinative usage-(or with alternate determinants), and a plural form in hieroglyphs as: M17-D46A:D46A-D46A:X1 Single forms for "dew" also use the Sky-with-rain (hieroglyph) as the determinative, with multiple spellings. M17-D46-G43-N4-Z3 The noun "dew" is based on the Coptic language  (five entries), and translated as: dew, mist, vapour, rain-storm, moisture, and exudation, listed under Egyptian language, iad, with some spellings of: N4-(rain)-.-M17-G1-D46:X1-D46A:N35:N35:N35-(one-example-of-seven)

Gallery

See also

Gardiner's Sign List#D. Parts of the Human Body
List of Egyptian hieroglyphs
Hand (hieroglyph)

References

Budge.  An Egyptian Hieroglyphic Dictionary,'' E.A.Wallace Budge, (Dover Publications), c 1978, (c 1920), Dover edition, 1978. (In two volumes, 1314 pp, and cliv-(154) pp.) (softcover)

Hand With Droplets